Runaljod – Gap var ginnunga (Sound of Runes – The gap was vast) is the first album by Norwegian Nordic folk group Wardruna. It was released 19 January 2009 by Indie Recordings/Fimbulljóð Productions.

The album is the first chapter of the Runaljod trilogy (continued on the next two Wardruna albums), inspired by the 24 ancient runes of the Elder Futhark.

The lyrics were composed by Kvitrafn in Norwegian, Old Norse and Proto-Norse. Nordic traditional instruments such as percussion and strings were used in the recording of the album.

Track listing
All songs written and arranged by Kvitrafn

Personnel
 Kvitrafn – Vocals and instruments
 Gaahl – Vocals
 Lindy Fay Hella – Vocals
 Hallvard Kleiveland – Hardanger fiddle

References
http://www.wardruna.com/

2009 debut albums
Wardruna albums